Christian Kukuk (born 4 March 1990) is a German equestrian. He competed in the individual jumping event at the 2020 Summer Olympics.

References

External links
 

1990 births
Living people
German male equestrians
Olympic equestrians of Germany
Equestrians at the 2020 Summer Olympics
German show jumping riders
People from Warendorf
Sportspeople from Münster (region)